Ludwig Roth (June 10, 1909 – November 1, 1967) was the Aerospace engineer who was the head of the Peenemünde Future Projects Office which designed the Wasserfall and created advanced rockets designs such as the A9/A10 ICBM.

Roth arrived in New York under Operation Paperclip on November 16, 1945 via the SS Argentina and served at Fort Bliss and Huntsville, Alabama. He and his family relocated to Palos Verdes, California. His son Axel Roth
went on to work for NASA as an engineer, and ended his career as Associate Director of Marshall Space Flight Center.  His son Volker worked for Boeing as Space Lab Design Manager. His grandson Karl Roth currently works for COLSA Corporation supporting International Space Station Payload Ground System Integration.

Publications

References

1909 births
1967 deaths
People from Groß-Gerau
People from the Grand Duchy of Hesse
Early spaceflight scientists
German aerospace engineers
German emigrants to the United States
20th-century German inventors
German people of World War II
Engineers from Hesse
People from Huntsville, Alabama
Operation Paperclip